Maulvi Sher Ali Ranjha (24 November 1875 – 13 November 1947)  was a prominent Ahmadi scholar and a companion of Mirza Ghulam Ahmad, who claimed to be the Promised Messiah and the awaited mahdi.

Early life
Sher Ali was born to a well off and educated Zamindar family that was part of the Ranjha Jat tribe.  He was the son of Maulvi Nizam ud Din. His mother died on 7 March 1907. A daughter of Sher Ali, with the name Khadija Beguum wrote his short biography Seerat Hadrat Maulvi Sher Ali. Sher Ali did his B.A. in 1897.

Works
When he heard of Mirza Ghulam Ahmad's claim he travelled to Qadian and gave his Bay'ah (Oath of Allegiance) at the hands of Ghulam Ahmad. He remained headmaster of the Talim-ul-Islam High School in Qadian. He spent his whole life in the service of the cause of Ahmadiyyah. He accompanied Mirza Basheer-ud-Din Mahmood Ahmad, the second khalifa of the Ahmadiyyah sect on his journey to Europe in 1924, and participated in the Wembley’s Conference of Living Religions 1924. He was a profound scholar of religious sciences and the Arabic language. In the central Organization of the Community, Maulvi Sher Ali served as director of publications (Nazir Taleef) at Qadian. He also published an exposition and rebuttal of the book Yana bi'ul Islam in his Review of Religions.

Death
His wife died on 12 July 1942 and Sher Ali died on 13 November 1947 at Lahore. He was buried at the Bahishti Maqbara (The Heavenly Graveyard) at Rabwah.

References 

Indian Ahmadis
1875 births
1947 deaths
Translators of the Quran into English
People from British India
Pakistani Ahmadis